Mount Sandved is a mountain, 2,440 m, standing 2 nautical miles (3.7 km) north of Mount Dougherty in the north part of the Queen Elizabeth Range. Mapped by the United States Geological Survey (USGS) from tellurometer surveys and Navy air photos, 1960–62. Named by Advisory Committee on Antarctic Names (US-ACAN) for Kurt G. Sandved, Information Officer at the Office of Antarctic Programs, National Science Foundation.

Mountains of the Ross Dependency
Shackleton Coast